This is a list of bridges and other crossings of the Assonet River in Bristol County, Massachusetts from its confluence with the Taunton River upstream to the Cedar Swamp River.

See also
List of crossings of the Taunton River

Assonet River
Assonet River
Bridges
Assonet River
Charles River crossings